Terrance Odette is a Canadian film director and screenwriter. He is most noted for his films Saint Monica, which premiered at the 2002 Toronto International Film Festival, and Fall, which premiered at the 2014 Vancouver International Film Festival and was a Canadian Screen Award nominee for Best Picture at the 3rd Canadian Screen Awards in 2015.

Originally from Kitchener, Ontario, Odette was active as a folk singer for a number of years before his forays into directing music videos led him to conclude that he was a better filmmaker than a musician. He released his debut feature film Heater in 1999.

He also directed the film Sleeping Dogs (2006), and episodes of the television series Connor Undercover, How to Be Indie and Annedroids.

He was a nominee for the Directors Guild of Canada's DGC Award for Best Direction in a Feature Film in 2015 for Fall.

References

External links

Living people
Canadian male screenwriters
Canadian music video directors
Canadian television directors
Film directors from Ontario
Writers from Kitchener, Ontario
20th-century Canadian screenwriters
21st-century Canadian screenwriters
20th-century Canadian male writers
21st-century Canadian male writers
Year of birth missing (living people)